Dongbei Special Steel Group Beiman Special Steel Co., Ltd. is a state-owned steel maker based in Qiqihar, Heilongjiang Province. Bei-man was the acronym of North Manchuria. The company is a subsidiary of Dongbei Special Steel (literally East-Northern Special Steel).

History
The steel refinery was found in 1952 in Fularji District, Qiqihar. The refinery was the only special steel maker in the First Five-year plan of China (1953–1957), with the aid of Soviet Union. The refinery was completed in 1957. It was one of the 512 important state-owned enterprises in 1997. (1 of 47 iron and steel industry)

In 1993, the steel refinery was incorporated as a subsidiary Beiman Special Steel Co., Ltd. and listed in Shanghai Stock Exchange (as ), which Bei Steel Group Co., Ltd. was the major shareholder for 64.32% stake. In 2001, the assets of the refinery was sold back to the parent company, while the listed company was sold to another state-owned enterprise and renamed to Longjian Road and Bridge, as a reverse IPO. Bei Steel Group Co., Ltd. was also renamed to Beiman Special Steel Group Co., Ltd...

In 2004, the State-owned Assets Supervision and Administration Commission (SASAC) of the Provincial Government of Heilongjiang, the parent entity of Beiman Special Steel, injected the steel refinery into Dongbei Special Steel, a holding company of Liaoning Government, as share capital. The holding company became the parent company of three steel refineries in Qiqihar, Dalian and Fushun.

As at 31 December 2014 the parent company owned 58.63% stake in Dongbei Special Steel Group Beiman Special Steel Co., Ltd.. Heilongjiang SASAC retained the rest.

References

External links
 

Steel companies of China
Companies based in Heilongjiang
Government agencies established in 1952
1952 establishments in China
Companies owned by the provincial government of China
China Orient Asset Management
Soviet foreign aid
China–Soviet Union relations